The Ultimate Fighter: Team Joanna vs. Team Cláudia (also known as The Ultimate Fighter 23) was an installment of the Ultimate Fighting Championship (UFC)-produced reality television series The Ultimate Fighter.

On January 17, 2016, during the live broadcast of UFC Fight Night 81, it was announced that the coaches for the season would be Joanna Jędrzejczyk and Cláudia Gadelha. The coaches faced one another in a UFC Women's Strawweight Championship bout at the conclusion of the season.

The UFC held open tryouts for the show on December 14, 2015. The casting call was for light heavyweight, women's bantamweight and women's strawweight fighters who were at least 21 years old and had a minimum of two wins in three professional fights. Subsequently, it was announced that eight light heavyweight and eight women's strawweight competitors would compete on the show. The cast was revealed on April 6, 2016.

Cast

Teams

  Team Joanna
Joanna Jędrzejczyk, Head Coach
Robert Drysdale, Jiu Jitsu Coach
Daniel Woirin, Muay Thai Coach
Paweł Derlacz
Szymon Bońkowski

   Team Cláudia:
Cláudia Gadelha, Head Coach
Jair Lourenço, Assistant Coach
Nenzão, Boxing Coach
Ronaldo Candido, Jiu Jitsu Coach
Rafael Vinícius, Kickboxing Coach

Fighters
Team Joanna
Light heavyweights: Josh Stansbury, Khalil Rountree, Myron Dennis, and Elias Urbina IV.
Women's Strawweights: JJ Aldrich, Jamie Moyle, Ashley Yoder, and Helen Harper.
Team Cláudia
Light heavyweights: Andrew Sanchez, Eric Spicely, Abdel Medjedoub, and Cory Hendricks.
Women's Strawweights: Tatiana Suarez, Kate Jackson, Amanda Cooper, and Lanchana Green.
Fighters eliminated before entry round
 Light heavyweights: Kenneth Bergh, Muhammed Dereese, Jamelle Jones, Norman Paraisy, John Paul Elias, Phil Hawes, Marcel Fortuna, and Trever Carlson.
 Women's Strawweights: Mellony Geugjes, Ashley Cummins, Alyssa Krahn, Jodie Esquibel, Kristi Lopez, Chel-c Bailey, Irene Cabello Rivera, and Amy Montenegro.

Episodes
Episode 1: Ladies and Gents (April 20, 2016)
 Dana White welcomed the 32 fighters, consisting of light heavyweights and women's strawweights, to the show. He introduced them to the coaches, Joanna Jędrzejczyk  and Cláudia Gadelha.
 The preliminary fights began:
Women's Strawweight – Amanda Cooper defeated Mellony Geugjes via submission (armbar) in the first round.
Light heavyweight – Eric Spicely defeated Kenneth Bergh via submission (rear-naked choke) in the first round.
Women's Strawweight – Lanchana Green defeated Ashley Cummins via TKO (knees and punches) in the second round.
Light heavyweight – Khalil Rountree defeated Muhammed Dereese via TKO (punches and soccer kicks to the body) in the second round.
Women's Strawweight – Jamie Moyle defeated Alyssa Krahn via submission (rear-naked choke) in the first round.
Light heavyweight – Myron Dennis defeated Jamelle Jones via TKO (punches) in the first round.
Women's Strawweight- Ashley Yoder defeated Jodie Esquibel via split decision after two rounds.
Light heavyweight – Elias Urbina IV defeated Norman Paraisy via unanimous decision after three rounds.
Women's Strawweight – JJ Aldrich defeated Kristi Lopez via unanimous decision after two rounds.
Light heavyweight – Abdel Medjedoub defeated John Paul Elias via unanimous decision after two rounds.
Women's Strawweight – Tatiana Suarez defeated Chel-c Bailey via unanimous decision after two rounds.
Light heavyweight – Andrew Sanchez defeated Phil Hawes via unanimous decision after two rounds.
Women's Strawweight – Kate Jackson defeated Irene Cabello Rivera via TKO (punches) in the second round.
Light heavyweight – Cory Hendricks defeated Marcel Fortuna via unanimous decision after three rounds.
Women's Strawweight – Helen Harper defeated Amy Montenegro via submission (armbar) in the first round.
Light heavyweight – Josh Stansbury defeated Trever Carlson via submission (americana) in the first round.
 White reminds the fighters that the winning fighter and coach will get a Harley Davidson motorcycle.
 White kicked off the tournament by flipping a coin (red for Joanna, blue for Cláudia) to determine which team will pick the first fight. Team Cláudia wins the coin toss and opts to choose the first fighter.
 Women's Strawweights selection:

 Light Heavyweights selection:

Jędrzejczyk announces the first fight and matches training partners Rountree against Hendricks.

Episode 2: Friends and Foes (April 27, 2016)

The fighters make their way into the TUF house and choose their bedrooms. However, there's a problem when Abdel Medjedoub arrives late and finds out there's only one bed left, which is in one of the female fighters' rooms. Being a Muslim and married, he cannot be put in that situation, so he asks Cory Hendricks, who is single, to room with the women. He takes "one for the team" and moves into their room. 
Hurt from his last fight to get into the house, Hendricks gets his swollen feet checked out by orthopedic surgeon and even though the bones in his feet are not broken, he suffers from a severe contusions to the soft tissue and must rest up before his next fight with his training partner Khalil Rountree.
Things heat up between the coaches Joanna and Cláudia, and a lot of trash talk commences.
Helen Harper gets sick and can't train with her team. She is found by Rountree, huddled on the floor in kitchen cupboard with her hands shaking, and is taken to the doctor.            
Cory Hendricks defeated Khalil Rountree via submission (rear-naked choke) in the first round.
Gadelha announces the first women's fight: Tatiana Suarez vs. JJ Aldrich.

Episode 3: Who I Am (May 4, 2016)
After recovering from being sick, Helen Harper injures her shoulder during grappling training and quickly gets upset, losing mental focus. Once again, Khalil Rountree is there for positive reinforcement. 
At the TUF house, Rountree challenges Cory Hendricks to a "UFC Doughnut Eating Championship"; who could eat a dozen donuts the fastest in 5 minutes. Rountree is the winner and earns the golden donut while Hendricks has to have one of the women apply makeup and wear a sports bra. Amanda Cooper gives him a full makeover.
As a reward for their hard work, the fighters receive a letter from an impressed Dana White inviting them to play a sneak peek of the new Doom video game.  
Before the fight, UFC welterweight champion Robbie Lawler and UFC Hall of Famer Matt Hughes visit Suarez with words of encouragement.
Tatiana Suarez defeated JJ Aldrich via submission (rear-naked choke) 3 minutes and 14 seconds into the second round.  
Gadelha announces the next men's fight: Andrew Sanchez vs. Myron Dennis.

Episode 4: Wake Up, Guys! (May 11, 2016)
After her team goes 0–2 losing the last two fights, Jędrzejczyk, being the extremely competitive person she is, lashes out at her fighters saying they "train like pussies," because she thinks they're slacking off in practice. 
Team Joanna responds with mixed feelings. When they get back to the TUF house, Myron Dennis huddles his teammates together and starts a rally cry, chanting what he's going to do to his opponent, Andrew Sanchez. 
Cláudia visits the house with her coaches to cook Brazilian barbecue for the fighters. 
As a joke, Kahlil Rountree wears a referee shirt and blows a whistle to kick the blue team out of the gym when it was Team Joanna's time to train. But Gadelha and her assistant coaches take their time leaving. Feeling disrespected, Jędrzejczyk gets angry and throws their kicking pads at them. 
As a way to blow off steam, both teams have a water balloon fight at the house.
Andrew Sanchez defeated Myron Dennis via unanimous decision after two rounds.
Gadelha announces the next women's fight: Lanchana Green vs. Helen Harper.

Episode 5: Battle of the Brits (May 18, 2016)

Jędrzejczyk brings in former Invicta and UFC strawweight champion, and The Ultimate Fighter 20 winner, Carla Esparza, to help coach her team with wrestling and grappling. 
Since the fighters cannot have contact with the outside world, TUF producer Lewis Massoll gets an emergency phone call from Abdel Medjedoub's wife Caroline and allows him to talk to her. Apparently, Medjedoub did something that she was not happy with before the show. She says that she is going to leave him if he does not come back home to Montreal. 
Lanchana Green defeated Helen Harper via unanimous decision after three rounds.
After the fight, Team Cláudia goes crazy celebrating the victory and Gadelha shakes hands with Team Joanna's corner. But adding more to the drama, she walks right past Jędrzejczyk herself, which the champion takes this as a huge sign of disrespect to her.
Gadelha announces the next men's fight: Eric Spicely vs. Elias Urbina.

Episode 6: The Situation (May 25, 2016)

White calls Abdel Medjedoub into his office to discuss his situation about his wife's ultimatum to quit the show or she's going to leave him. White lets him talk to her on the phone but she wants him to answer for his mistake in person. 
Not wanting Medjedoub chose between his career or his marriage, White gives him a few days to straighten this emergency out and he will fly him back to the show. 
Elias Urbina shows a few teammates the poster of his TUF alumni older brother, Hector Urbina, who was a cast member of TUF season 19.
Khalil Rountree's knees have been sore and the doctor says he has minor tendinitis. During training, he has been getting sharp pain while in different grappling positions and his positive attitude suddenly goes to frustration. So he takes a few days off to rest.
At the TUF house, Rountree and Urbina decide to prank the female fighters by putting baby powder in their hairdryers. In retaliation, the women throw baby powder on some of the men, while they are in the hot tub. Also, Myron Dennis gets a scare from Rountree who jumps out of the tub in the bathroom. 
As promised, Medjedoub handles his business, flying back in a few days and continues to compete on the show.
Eric Spicely defeated Elias Urbina via unanimous decision after two rounds.
Gadelha announces the next women's fight: Amanda Cooper vs. Jamie Moyle.

Episode 7: No Easy Fight (June 1, 2016)

Since Team Cláudia could potentially go down as the first team to pull a sweep, Jędrzejczyk is feeling the pressure and will do anything to get her fighters motivated, including saying the upcoming women's match-up with Amanda Cooper will be an "easy fight" for Jamie Moyle. Team Cláudia just brushes the comment off.
Jędrzejczyk also brings in former UFC bantamweight champion  T.J. Dillashaw to guest coach. 
At the TUF house, Khalil Rountree breaks down because he nearly forget his late father's birthday, which he still celebrates in his honor, since he died when Rountree was only 2-year's-old.
White surprises the fighters for their hardcore performances this season with a night out on the Las Vegas Strip. He rents them a party bus and things get crazy on the when Ashley Yoder gets on the stripper pole. They then see the show Absinthe and things heat up when Josh Stansbury and Myron Dennis are called up on stage to do a strip tease on Jamie Moyle.
Amanda Cooper defeated Jamie Moyle via majority decision after two rounds.
After the fight, believing it should have gone to a third round, Jędrzejczyk tells off the judges. Team Joanna is down 0–6.
Gadelha announces the next men's fight: Abdel Medjedoub vs. Josh Stansbury.

Episode 8: It's a Mental Thing (June 8, 2016)

Team Cláudia remains unbeaten, winning six straight fights and are very close to making TUF history by becoming the first team ever to sweep the preliminaries.  
During grappling practice, Cory Hendricks injures his shoulder, causing him to have severe neck and arm pain. So he decides to take it easy before he goes back to hard training again. Instead of going to the doctor, due to fearing that he will be told not to fight, Hendricks sees an acupuncturist, who along with basic needle acupuncture, she performed a therapy called "cupping" and a Chinese technique called "gua sha". 
Later, Hendricks has to go to the doctor anyway since his pain continues. The doctor orders an MRI and has to wait for a diagnoses.
Josh Stansbury defeated Abdel Medjedoub via majority decision after two rounds.
The red team finally gets their first win of the season, stopping Team Cláudia's 6–0 win streak.
Jędrzejczyk announces the next women's fight: Ashley Yoder vs. Kate Jackson.

Episode 9: Beast Inside of You (June 15, 2016)

The doctor visits Hendricks with the results from the MRI. It showed nothing serious, it's just a pain issue, so he can continue in the competition.
Since their strawweight title match is coming up soon, Jędrzejczyk and Gadelha have to not only coach, but they have to train as well, and do so at their respected gyms.
Kate Jackson defeated Ashley Yoder via unanimous decision after two rounds.
One man and no women from Team Joanna will move on to the semi-finals.
Team Cláudia finished 7–1, but ends up in an unfortunate situation that most of them will be fighting against each other. Gadelha states that this hurts her because her team are like a family.
White announces the semi-final fights: 
Andrew Sanchez vs. Eric Spicely.
Amanda Cooper vs. Lanchana Green.
Tatiana Suarez vs. Kate Jackson.
Josh Stansbury vs. Cory Hendricks.

Episode 10: Friends Hurting Friends (June 22, 2016)

Team Cláudia still has seven fighters in the competition and has claimed every semifinal in the strawweight division and every light heavyweight, except for one.
With a nerve injury in his neck, Cory Hendricks initially decides to push through the pain and continue to train, however, after being in intense constant pain, he takes Cláudia's advice and drops out of the competition to fight in the future.
Dana rewards the fighters and arranges to take them out for a night on the town. They feast at Brooklyn Bowl Buffet, and the High Roller at The Linq but Cláudia gets annoyed the Joanna keeps taking the credit for all of Dana's surprises.
Khalil Rountree replaces Cory Hendricks in the competition, but it's bittersweet because he has to fight Josh Stansbury, his teammate, and he gets upset.
Dana gives Cory another chance after he heals by letting him fight in the TUF finale.
This is the first time that Team Cláudia has to fight each other and they get emotional, especially for Eric Spicely, who breaks down, not wanting to fight Andrew Sanchez, his friend and training partner.
It's that time of the season for the Coach's Challenge. This year, it's the biggest and craziest one they've ever done. There are two massive dunk tanks high off the ground. Both coaches stand at the top and shoot an air rifle that fires tennis balls at a target. If one of them hits the bullseye of 20 points, the other gets dunked into the ice cold water. The first coach to 100 points wins $10,000 cash, with each fighter getting $1,500 each.
Cláudia wins by dunking Joanna 3 times to her 2 and is first to rack up 100 points. So Dana issues one more challenge; see if she can dunk him for another $5,000 and her team getting $500 each. Dana is afraid of heights, but he isn't up there for long since Cláudia hits the bullseye on the first try.
Andrew Sanchez defeated Eric Spicely via knockout (punches) in the first round.
After the fight, Andrew is distraught and concerned about knocking out Eric and crushing his dream.

Episode 11: Bump in the Road (June 29, 2016) 

Cláudia invites UFC bantamweight champion Miesha Tate to guest coach, helping her team with wrestling techniques.
At the TUF house, the fighters decide to have some fun and put on their own bowling tournament with water bottles as pins. Lanchana Green wins the homemade paper medal. 
During the weigh-in, Amanda Cooper fails to make weight and weights in at 117 1/2 lb. She has only one hour to lose 1 1/2 pounds. The entire team helps her with the cut and she makes weight.
Amanda Cooper defeated Lanchana Green via submission (rear-naked choke) in the first round.

Episode 12: Fight of the Season (July 6, 2016) 
Tatiana Suarez defeated Kate Jackson via submission (Guillotine choke) in the first round.
Khalil Rountree defeated Josh Stansbury via TKO (Technical Knockout) in the first round.

Tournament Bracket

Light heavyweight Bracket

Hendricks was replaced by Rountree after he pulled out of the competition due to a neck injury.

Strawweight Bracket

The Ultimate Fighter 23 Finale

The Ultimate Fighter: Team Joanna vs. Team Cláudia Finale (also known as The Ultimate Fighter 23 Finale) was a mixed martial arts event held on July 8, 2016 at the MGM Grand Garden Arena in Las Vegas, Nevada. This event was a part of UFC International Fight Week.

Background
The event was headlined by a UFC Women's Strawweight Championship bout between current champion Joanna Jędrzejczyk and top contender Cláudia Gadelha. The pair previously met at UFC on Fox: dos Santos vs. Miocic in December 2014, with Jędrzejczyk winning via split decision.

Scott Askham was expected to face Anthony Smith at the event, but pulled out on April 28 due to injury and was replaced by The Ultimate Fighter: Brazil winner Cezar Ferreira.

Stevie Ray was expected to face Jake Matthews at the event, but pulled out on June 2 citing alleged visa issues and was replaced by Kevin Lee.

James Krause was scheduled to face The Ultimate Fighter: United States vs. United Kingdom lightweight winner Ross Pearson at the event. However, on June 13, he was pulled from the fight for undisclosed reasons. He was replaced by former Bellator Lightweight Champion and promotional newcomer Will Brooks.

Results

Scorecard for Jędrzejczyk and Gadelha

Bonus awards
The following fighters were awarded $50,000 bonuses:
Fight of the Night: Joanna Jędrzejczyk vs. Cláudia Gadelha
Performance of the Night: Tatiana Suarez and Doo Ho Choi

Reported payout
The following is the reported payout to the fighters as reported to the Nevada State Athletic Commission. It does not include sponsor money and also does not include the UFC's traditional "fight night" bonuses.

 Joanna Jędrzejczyk: $210,000 (includes $105,000 win bonus) def. Cláudia Gadelha: $100,000
 Andrew Sanchez: $30,000 (includes $15,000 win bonus) def. Khalil Rountree: $15,000
 Tatiana Suarez: $30,000 (includes $15,000 win bonus) def. Amanda Cooper: $15,000
 Will Brooks: $100,000 (includes $50,000 win bonus) def. Ross Pearson: $54,000
 Doo Ho Choi: $24,000 (includes $12,000 win bonus) def. Thiago Tavares: $37,000
 Joaquim Silva: $24,000 (includes $12,000 win bonus) def. Andrew Holbrook: $12,000
 Gray Maynard: $96,000 (includes $48,000 win bonus) def. Fernando Bruno: $12,000 
 Matheus Nicolau: $24,000 (includes $17,000 win bonus) def. John Moraga: $24,000
 Josh Stansbury: $20,000 (includes $10,000 win bonus) def. Cory Hendricks: $10,000
 Cezar Ferreira: $54,000 (includes $27,000 win bonus) def. Anthony Smith: $15,000
 Kevin Lee: $54,000 (includes $27,000 win bonus) def. Jake Matthews: $22,000
 Li Jingliang: $24,000 (includes $12,000 win bonus) def. Anton Zafir: $10,000

See also
List of UFC events
2016 in UFC

References

2016 American television series debuts
2010s American reality television series
The Ultimate Fighter episodes